Cymatophoropsis is a genus of moths of the family Noctuidae. The genus was erected by George Hampson in 1894.

Species
Cymatophoropsis dubernardi (Houlbert, 1921)
Cymatophoropsis expansa (Houlbert, 1921)
Cymatophoropsis heurippa (H. Druce, 1889) Panama
Cymatophoropsis sinuata (Moore, 1879) Bengal
Cymatophoropsis trimaculata (Bremer, 1861) south-eastern Siberia, Korea, Japan
Cymatophoropsis unca Houlbert, 1921 Korea, Japan

References

Calpinae